The Object REXX programming language is an object-oriented scripting language initially produced by IBM for the operating system OS/2 and later for Microsoft Windows. It is a follow-on to and a significant extension of the "Classic Rexx" language originally created for the Conversational Monitor System (CMS) component of the operating system VM/SP Release 3 and later ported to Multiple Virtual Storage (MVS), OS/2 and PC DOS. 

The OS/2 version of IBM Object REXX includes classes to support IBM System Object Model (SOM) and Workplace Shell (WPS). It is also included in ArcaOS.

On October 12, 2004, IBM released Object REXX as free and open-source software, giving rise to Open Object Rexx (ooREXX), now available for various operating systems: Linux, Solaris, Windows, MacOS. This implementation includes a Windows Script Host (WSH) Scripting Engine for Rexx. The released sources however didn't include the classes for SOM and Workplace Shell (WPS) support.

Object REXX supports multiple inheritance via the use of mixin classes.

Notes

References

External links
Rexx Language Association
Open Object Rexx 5.0.0 documentation
Open Object Rexx on Sourceforge

Class-based programming languages
IBM software
Object-oriented programming languages
Free compilers and interpreters
Cross-platform software
Scripting languages
Rexx